Janigleison Herculano Alves, better known as Gleison Tibau (born July 10, 1983) is a Brazilian mixed martial artist currently competing in the Welterweight division. A professional since 1999, he has competed for the UFC, Professional Fighters League (PFL), DEEP, and Golden Boy Promotions.

Early life
Tibau began training for mixed martial arts at 13 and was fighting by 15. He was a state champion in Rio de Janeiro in both Brazilian jiu-jitsu and wrestling. He was brought up as a fighter in Kimura team, from northern Brazil. Tibau trains at American Top Team.

Mixed martial arts career

Ultimate Fighting Championship
Tibau made his UFC debut at welterweight against Nick Diaz. Tibau started strong and was taking Diaz down efficiently while avoiding submissions using Brazilian Jiu Jitsu. In the second round he got tired and lost by TKO due to strikes. Tibau took on Jason Dent at UFC 68. Tibau won by unanimous decision. He then took a one fight hiatus from the company and returned to defeat Jeff Cox by submission due to an arm-triangle choke. Tibau then fought undefeated Brit Terry Etim, outwrestling his opponent for a unanimous decision.

Tibau then lost back to back fights to Tyson Griffin at UFC 81 and Joe Stevenson at UFC 86. He was on the verge of release from UFC by president Dana White. He rebounded with back to back wins over Rich Clementi and Jeremy Stephens.

At the TUF 9 Finale, Tibau fought Melvin Guillard. Tibau lost by split decision. Many thought Tibau won the fight.

Tibau's next fight was at UFC 104 where Tibau beat Josh Neer after landing 10 takedowns via unanimous decision (30-27, 30–27, 30–27).

Tibau won his second straight match with a first-round TKO over Caol Uno on March 31, 2010 at UFC Fight Night 21. Tibau faced Jim Miller on September 15, 2010 at UFC Fight Night 22. He lost the fight via unanimous decision.

Tibau beat Kurt Pellegrino on March 19, 2011 at UFC 128 via split decision.

Tibau then defeated veteran Rafaello Oliveira via second round rear naked choke, earning Submission of the Night honors.

Tibau won via split decision against Rafael dos Anjos on November 19, 2011 at UFC 139. Tibau next faced undefeated prospect Khabib Nurmagomedov on July 7, 2012 at UFC 148, losing via unanimous decision.

Tibau fought Francisco Trinaldo on October 13, 2012 at UFC 153 winning via unanimous decision.

He lost to Evan Dunham on February 2, 2013 at UFC 156 by split decision. Tibau then faced John Cholish on May 18, 2013 at UFC on FX 8, winning via second round submission.

Tibau beat Jamie Varner on August 31, 2013 at UFC 164 by split decision. With this fight, he became the youngest fighter in UFC history to record 20 bouts.

Tibau lost to Michael Johnson in the last fight of his contract on December 28, 2013 at UFC 168 via second-round knockout.

On January 16, 2014, Tibau signed a four-fight contract.

Tibau faced Pat Healy on July 16, 2014 at UFC Fight Night 45, winning by unanimous decision.

Tibau next faced Piotr Hallmann on September 13, 2014 at UFC Fight Night 51. He won the back-and-forth fight via split decision.  This fight earned Tibau his first Fight of the Night bonus award. Following the bout Hallmann failed his post fight drug test due to the presence of drostanolone in his system.

Tibau defeated Norman Parke on January 18, 2015 at UFC Fight Night 59, replacing Jorge Masvidal,  winning via split decision.

Tibau replaced an injured Yancy Medeiros was against Tony Ferguson on February 28, 2015 at UFC 184, losing by submission in the first round, his first submission defeat since his 2008 loss to Joe Stevenson.

Tibau defeated Abel Trujillo at UFC Fight Night 77 on November 7, 2015 via a first round submission. Tibau took Trujillo's back, secured a body triangle from the bottom and grabbed a rear-naked choke grip with his arm underneath Trujillo's chin. After a few seconds in this position, referee Keith Peterson halted the contest as he believed that Trujillo was unconscious. Trujillo indicated that he planned to appeal the decision in hopes that the result may be changed to a No Contest.

On December 4, 2015, Tibau was suspended by USADA due to a potential Anti-Doping Policy violation stemming from an out-of-competition test. On December 23, 2015, it was reported that he had also failed an in-competition test following his win over Trujillo. On February 18, 2016 Tibau was suspended for 2 years by USADA as well as having the result of his fight against Trujillo reversed to a loss.

Tibau faced Islam Makhachev on January 20, 2018 at UFC 220. He lost the fight by knockout in the first round.

Tibau faced Desmond Green on June 1, 2018 at UFC Fight Night 131. He lost the fight by unanimous decision.

Tibau's bout with Green marked the last fight of his contract and after more than a decade in the UFC, Tibau chose not to renew the contract, becoming a free agent.

Post-UFC career
After the long career in the UFC, Tibau revealed he will be moving up to welterweight division. On September 4, 2018, it was revealed that Tibau would fight Golden Boy Promotions' inaugural MMA event, headlined by the third encounter of Chuck Liddell and Tito Ortiz. Despite the announcement on going up a weight class, Tibau faced fellow UFC veteran Efrain Escudero in a 160lbs catchweight bout. He won the fight via unanimous decision.

Tibau replaced Abel Trujillo on short notice against Will Brooks at Battlefield FC 2 on July 27, 2019 winning by Round 1 Submission.

Tibau was next expected to face Chris Cisneros at Taura MMA 11 on October 30, 2020. However, the bout was moved to Taura MMA 12 on November 22, 2020, which in turn was postponed due to COVID-19 pandemic related issues.

Professional Fighters League

2021 season 
On February 25, 2021, news surfaced that Tibau had signed with Professional Fighters League and is expected to compete in the welterweight tournament of season 2021.

Tibau was set to face fellow UFC vet Alexey Kunchenko on April 29, 2021 at PFL 2 as the start of the 2021 PFL Welterweight tournament. On March 25, it was announced that Kunchenko pulled out of the bout and due to this Tibau was set to face João Zeferino.  He lost the bout via unanimous decision.

Tibau faced Rory MacDonald at PFL 5 on June 17, 2021.  He won the fight by a controversial split decision, with the vast majority of media scores and other professional MMA fighters scoring the bout as a win for MacDonald. Despite the victory over MacDonald, Tibau did not advance to the playoffs.

Tibau was scheduled to face Sadibou Sy on August 13, 2021 at PFL 7. However on August 4, it was announced that Sy replaced João Zeferino in the playoffs, and therefore Tibau's new opponent would be Curtis Millender. On August 12, Millender was announced to have pulled out of the bout, so Tibau instead faced Micah Terrill. Tibau won the bout via technical submission, choking Terrill unconscious in the first round via arm-triangle choke.

2022 season 
Tibau faced Jarrah Al-Silawi on May 6, 2022 at PFL 3. He lost the bout via controversial split decision.

Tibau was scheduled to face Nikolai Aleksakhin on July 1, 2022 at PFL 6. However, Tibau pulled out of the bout and was replaced by Carlos Leal.

Tibau faced Magomed Magomedkerimov on November 25, 2022 at PFL 10. He lost the bout via unanimous decision.

Post PFL 
Tibau faced Alexey Kunchenko on February 11, 2023 at RCC, losing the bout via unanimous decision.

Championships and Accomplishments

Mixed Martial Arts
Ultimate Fighting Championship
Fight of the Night (One time) 
Submission of the Night (One time) 
Tied (Beneil Dariush) for third most wins in UFC Lightweight division history (16)
Most takedowns landed in the UFC Lightweight division (84)
Second most takedowns landed in UFC history (84)
Most split decision wins in UFC history (5)

Mixed martial arts record

|-
|Loss
|align=center|37–18
|Alexey Kunchenko
|Decision (unanimous)
|RCC 14
|
|align=center|3
|align=center|5:00
|Tyumen, Russia
|
|-
|Loss
|align=center|37–17
|
|Decision (unanimous)
|PFL 10
|
|align=center|3
|align=center|5:00
|New York City, New York, United States
|
|-
|Loss
|align=center|37–16
|Jarrah Al Silawi
|Decision (split)
|PFL 3
|
|align=center|3
|align=center|5:00
|Arlington, Texas, United States
|
|-
|Win
|align=center|37–15
|Micah Terrill
|Technical Submission (arm-triangle choke)
|PFL 7
|
|align=center|1
|align=center|2:17
|Hollywood, Florida, United States
|
|-
|Win
|align=center|36–15
|Rory MacDonald
|Decision (split)
|PFL 5
|
|align=center|3
|align=center|5:00
|Atlantic City, New Jersey, United States
|
|-
|Loss
|align=center|35–15
|João Zeferino
|Decision (unanimous)
|PFL 2
|
|align=center|3
|align=center|5:00
|Atlantic City, New Jersey, United States
| 
|-
|Win
|align=center|35–14
|Will Brooks
|Submission (guillotine choke)
|Battlefield FC 2
|
|align=center|1
|align=center|3:34
|Macau, SAR, China
|
|-
| Win
| align=center|34–14
| Efrain Escudero
| Decision (unanimous)
| Golden Boy Promotions: Liddell vs. Ortiz 3
| 
| align=center| 3
| align=center| 5:00
| Inglewood, California, United States
| 
|- 
|Loss
|align=center|33–14
|Desmond Green
|Decision (unanimous)
|UFC Fight Night: Rivera vs. Moraes
|
|align=center|3
|align=center|5:00
|Utica, New York, United States
|
|-
|Loss
|align=center|33–13
|Islam Makhachev
|KO (punch)
|UFC 220
|
|align=center|1
|align=center|0:57
|Boston, Massachusetts, United States
|
|-
|Loss 
|align=center|33–12
|Abel Trujillo
|DQ (overturned)
|UFC Fight Night: Belfort vs. Henderson 3
|
|align=center|1
|align=center|1:45
|São Paulo, Brazil
|
|-
| Loss
| align=center| 33–11
| Tony Ferguson
| Submission (rear-naked choke)
| UFC 184
| 
| align=center|1
| align=center|2:37
| Los Angeles, California, United States
|
|-
| Win
| align=center|33–10
| Norman Parke
| Decision (split)
| UFC Fight Night: McGregor vs. Siver
| 
| align=center|3
| align=center|5:00
| Boston, Massachusetts, United States
| 
|-
| Win
| align=center|32–10
| Piotr Hallmann
| Decision (split)
| UFC Fight Night: Bigfoot vs. Arlovski
| 
| align=center|3
| align=center|5:00
| Brasília, Brazil
| 
|-
| Win
| align=center|31–10
| Pat Healy
| Decision (unanimous)
| UFC Fight Night: Cowboy vs. Miller
| 
| align=center|3
| align=center|5:00
| Atlantic City, New Jersey, United States
| 
|-
| Loss
| align=center|30–10
| Michael Johnson
| KO (punches)
| UFC 168
| 
| align=center|2
| align=center|1:32
| Las Vegas, Nevada, United States
| 
|-
| Win
| align=center|30–9
| Jamie Varner
| Decision (split)
| UFC 164
| 
| align=center|3
| align=center|5:00
| Milwaukee, Wisconsin, United States
| 
|-
| Win
| align=center|29–9
| John Cholish
| Submission (guillotine choke)
| UFC on FX: Belfort vs. Rockhold
| 
| align=center|2
| align=center|2:34
| Jaraguá do Sul, Brazil
| 
|-
| Loss
| align=center|28–9
| Evan Dunham
| Decision (split)
| UFC 156
| 
| align=center|3
| align=center|5:00
| Las Vegas, Nevada, United States
| 
|-
| Win
| align=center|28–8
| Francisco Trinaldo
| Decision (unanimous)
| UFC 153
| 
| align=center|3
| align=center|5:00
| Rio de Janeiro, Brazil
| 
|-
| Loss
| align=center|27–8
| Khabib Nurmagomedov
| Decision (unanimous)
| UFC 148
| 
| align=center|3
| align=center|5:00
| Las Vegas, Nevada, United States
| 
|-
| Win
| align=center|27–7
| Rafael dos Anjos
| Decision (split)
| UFC 139
| 
| align=center|3
| align=center|5:00
| San Jose, California, United States
| 
|-
| Win
| align=center|26–7
| Rafaello Oliveira
| Submission (rear-naked choke)
| UFC 130
| 
| align=center|2
| align=center|3:28
| Las Vegas, Nevada, United States
| 
|-
| Win
| align=center|25–7
| Kurt Pellegrino
| Decision (split)
| UFC 128
| 
| align=center|3
| align=center|5:00
| Newark, New Jersey, United States
| 
|-
| Loss
| align=center|24–7
| Jim Miller
| Decision (unanimous)
| UFC Fight Night: Marquardt vs. Palhares
| 
| align=center|3
| align=center|5:00
| Austin, Texas, United States
| 
|-
| Win
| align=center|24–6
| Caol Uno
| TKO (punches)
| UFC Fight Night: Florian vs. Gomi
| 
| align=center|1
| align=center|4:13
| Charlotte, North Carolina, United States
| 
|-
| Win
| align=center|23–6
| Josh Neer
| Decision (unanimous)
| UFC 104
| 
| align=center|3
| align=center|5:00
| Los Angeles, California, United States
| 
|-
| Loss
| align=center|22–6
| Melvin Guillard
| Decision (split)
| The Ultimate Fighter: United States vs. United Kingdom Finale
| 
| align=center|3
| align=center|5:00
| Las Vegas, Nevada, United States
| 
|-
| Win
| align=center|22–5
| Jeremy Stephens
| Decision (unanimous)
| UFC Fight Night: Condit vs. Kampmann
| 
| align=center|3
| align=center|5:00
| Nashville, Tennessee, United States
| 
|-
| Win
| align=center|21–5
| Rich Clementi
| Submission (guillotine choke)
| UFC Fight Night: Lauzon vs. Stephens
| 
| align=center|1
| align=center|4:35
| Tampa, Florida, United States
| 
|-
| Loss
| align=center|20–5
| Joe Stevenson
| Submission (guillotine choke)
| UFC 86
| 
| align=center|2
| align=center|2:57
| Las Vegas, Nevada, United States
| 
|-
| Loss
| align=center|20–4
| Tyson Griffin
| Decision (unanimous)
| UFC 81
| 
| align=center|3
| align=center|5:00
| Las Vegas, Nevada, United States
| 
|-
| Win
| align=center|20–3
| Terry Etim
| Decision (unanimous)
| UFC 75
| 
| align=center|3
| align=center|5:00
| London, England
| 
|-
| Win
| align=center|19–3
| Jeff Cox
| Submission (arm-triangle choke)
| UFC Fight Night: Stout vs. Fisher
| 
| align=center|1
| align=center|1:52
| Hollywood, Florida, United States
| 
|-
| Win
| align=center|18–3
| Antonio Moreno
| TKO (punches)
| Nordest Combat Championship
| 
| align=center|1
| align=center|0:55
| Natal, Brazil
| 
|-
| Win
| align=center|17–3
| Jason Dent
| Decision (unanimous)
| UFC 68
| 
| align=center|3
| align=center|5:00
| Columbus, Ohio, United States
| 
|-
| Loss
| align=center|16–3
| Nick Diaz
| TKO (punches)
| UFC 65
| 
| align=center|2
| align=center|2:27
| Sacramento, California, United States
| 
|-
| Win
| align=center| 16–2
| Jędrzej Kubski
| Submission (rear-naked choke)
| KO Arena 4
| 
| align=center| 1
| align=center| 1:03
| Málaga, Spain
| 
|-
| Win
| align=center| 15–2
| Edilson Florencio
| Submission (triangle choke)
| Mega Combate Mossoró
| 
| align=center| 1
| align=center| 3:26
| Mossoró, Brazil
| 
|-
| Win
| align=center| 14–2
| Fabrício Camões
| Submission (rear-naked choke)
| Meca World Vale Tudo 12
| 
| align=center| 1
| align=center| 2:15
| Rio de Janeiro, Brazil
| 
|-
| Loss
| align=center| 13–2
| Marcelo Brito
| Decision (unanimous)
| Storm Samurai 7 
| 
| align=center| 3
| align=center| 5:00
| Curitiba, Brazil
| 
|-
| Win
| align=center| 13–1
| Josenildo Rodrigues
| Decision (unanimous)
| Ceara Open 2
| 
| align=center| 3
| align=center| 5:00
| Fortaleza, Brazil
| 
|-
| Win
| align=center| 12–1
| Anderson Cruz
| KO (punches)
| Octagon Fight
| 
| align=center| 1
| align=center| N/A
| Natal, Brazil
| 
|-
| Win
| align=center| 11–1
| Josenildo Ramalho
| Submission (armbar)
| Brazilian Challenger 2
| 
| align=center| 1
| align=center| N/A
| Natal, Brazil
| 
|-
| Win
| align=center| 10–1
| Carlos Alexandre Pereira
| Submission (rear-naked choke)
| Champions Night 11
| 
| align=center| 1
| align=center| 1:16
| Fortaleza, Brazil
| 
|-
| Win
| align=center| 9–1
| Adriano Martins
| Decision (unanimous)
| Amazon Fight
| 
| align=center| 3
| align=center| 5:00
| Manaus, Brazil
| 
|-
| Win
| align=center| 8–1
| Daniel Muralha
| Submission (armbar)
| Champions Night 10
| 
| align=center| 1
| align=center| N/A
| Marília, Brazil
| 
|-
| Win
| align=center| 7–1
| Romario da Silva
| Submission (rear-naked choke)
| Desafio: Natal vs Nordeste
| 
| align=center| 1
| align=center| 2:30
| Natal, Brazil
| 
|-
| Loss
| align=center| 6–1
| Eiji Mitsuoka
| TKO (corner stoppage)
| DEEP: 11th Impact
| 
| align=center| 2
| align=center| 3:41
| Osaka, Japan
| 
|-
| Win
| align=center| 6–0
| Fernando Terere
| Decision (split)
| Bitetti Combat Nordeste 2
| 
| align=center| 3
| align=center| 5:00
| Natal, Brazil
| 
|-
| Win
| align=center| 5–0
| Unknown Fighter
| Submission (americana)
| Tibau Fight
| 
| align=center| 1
| align=center| 0:00
| Natal, Brazil
| 
|-
| Win
| align=center| 4–0
| Paulo Boiko
| Decision (unanimous)
| Bitetti Combat Nordeste 1
| 
| align=center| 3
| align=center| 5:00
| Natal, Brazil
| 
|-
| Win
| align=center| 3–0
| Thiago Alves
| Submission (armbar)
| Champions Night 2
| 
| align=center| 2
| align=center| 3:31
| Natal, Brazil
| 
|-
| Win
| align=center| 2–0
| Rivanio Regiz
| Decision (unanimous)
| Currais Novos Vale Tudo Open 
| 
| align=center| 3
| align=center| 5:00
| Currais Novos, Brazil
| 
|-
| Win
| align=center| 1–0
| Ricardo Ricardo
| TKO (retirement)
| Mossoro Open de Vale Tudo 3 
| 
| align=center| 1
| align=center| N/A
| Natal, Brazil
|

See also
 List of male mixed martial artists

References

External links
 Gleison Tibau at PFL
 
 

Brazilian practitioners of Brazilian jiu-jitsu
People awarded a black belt in Brazilian jiu-jitsu
Brazilian male sport wrestlers
Brazilian male mixed martial artists
Brazilian sportspeople in doping cases
Doping cases in mixed martial arts
Lightweight mixed martial artists
Mixed martial artists utilizing Brazilian jiu-jitsu
Mixed martial artists utilizing wrestling
Sportspeople from Rio Grande do Norte
Brazilian expatriate sportspeople in the United States
Living people
1983 births
People from Coconut Creek, Florida
Ultimate Fighting Championship male fighters